Lars Erik Humlekjær (born 1971) is a Norwegian archer. He was born in Fredrikstad, and is a son of Jan Erik Humlekjær. He competed in archery at the 2000 Summer Olympics in Sydney, where he placed tenth with the Norwegian team and 40th in the individual competition.

References

External links

1971 births
Living people
Sportspeople from Fredrikstad
Norwegian male archers
Olympic archers of Norway
Archers at the 2000 Summer Olympics